Lorenzen Vern-Gagne Wright (November 4, 1975 – July 19, 2010) was an American professional basketball player for 13 seasons in the National Basketball Association. He was drafted seventh overall in the 1996 NBA draft by the Los Angeles Clippers and played for the Atlanta Hawks, Memphis Grizzlies, Sacramento Kings, and Cleveland Cavaliers.

Wright went missing on July 18, 2010, and was found shot to death 10 days later. In December 2017, his ex-wife Sherra Wright-Robinson was charged with facilitating his murder; a year and a half later, she pled guilty. Her friend, Billy Ray Turner, was convicted of first-degree murder, conspiracy to commit first-degree murder, and attempted first-degree murder in March 2022, and received a life sentence in prison. Widespread coverage of his disappearance, as well as his status as a popular Memphis figure, led to the prosecution of his murder being highly publicized in Memphis.

Early life and college
Raised in Oxford, Mississippi, Wright played for Lafayette High School in Mississippi before moving to Memphis, where he spent his senior year playing for Booker T. Washington High School. He played all levels of basketball in Memphis – high school, collegiate, and professional. His father, Herb, was a professional basketball player who competed in Finland, and once had a tryout with the Utah Jazz. When Wright was seven years old, Herb was working for the Memphis Police Department when he was paralyzed by a gunshot to the back.

Wright was recognized as a Third Team All-American by the Associated Press as a sophomore at the University of Memphis. Wright was a member of Kappa Alpha Psi.

Professional career
Wright was selected seventh overall by the Los Angeles Clippers in the 1996 NBA Draft out of the University of Memphis. On April 26, 1997, as a rookie, Wright scored what would be a postseason career-high 17 points in a Game 2 loss against the Utah Jazz. The Clippers would go on to lose the series. The following season, on December 26, 1997, Wright scored a season-high 32 points and grabbed 15 rebounds in an overtime loss to the Los Angeles Lakers.  Wright moved on to the Atlanta Hawks in 1999, and averaged a career high 12.4 points per game with them during the 2000-01 NBA season. He was traded to the Memphis Grizzlies on June 27, 2001. On January 6, 2003, Wright scored 20 points and grabbed 14 rebounds in a 106-102 win over the New Orleans Hornets. Wright returned to the Hawks in 2006.

On February 16, 2008, he was involved in a multiplayer trade, going from Atlanta to Sacramento for Mike Bibby.

He held career averages of 8.0 points and 6.4 rebounds per game, playing in 778 (793 including playoffs) NBA games over 13 seasons.

Personal life
Wright founded the Sierra Simone Wright Scholarship Fund after the death of his infant daughter in March 2003.

During the summer of 2003, he returned to the University of Memphis to finish his degree.

During his first stint in Atlanta, Wright and three other Memphis-native NBA players (Todd Day, Penny Hardaway, and Elliot Perry) provided financial assistance to Travis Butler, a Memphis orphan whose tragic story garnered national attention.

Disappearance and death
According to his ex-wife (who was later convicted of facilitating his murder), Wright left his home in Collierville, Tennessee on the night of July 18, 2010, with drugs and an unspecified amount of money, and was not seen or heard from again. His family filed a missing-persons report on July 22. After Wright's body was found on July 28 in a wooded area on Callis-Cutoff Road just west of Hacks Cross Road,  a 9-1-1 call reportedly had been received from his cell phone in the early morning of July 19 by the 911 dispatch center in Germantown, Tennessee. The caller was speaking with the dispatcher when 11 gunshots rang out. The dispatcher did not report the call to her supervisor until eight days later, hindering the police investigation and resulting in a payout to Wright's family. The case was investigated as a homicide. Wright's body is buried in Calvary Cemetery in Memphis, Tennessee. In 2011, a reward for information related to the killing stood at $21,000; the state of Tennessee contributed $10,000, the city of Memphis and the Memphis Grizzlies each promised $5,000, and Crime Stoppers promised $1,000.

On November 9, 2017, the gun believed to have been used to murder Wright was found in a lake in Walnut, Mississippi. On December 5, 2017, Billy R. Turner, a landscaper and church deacon at Mt. Olive No. 1 Missionary Baptist Church in Collierville, was indicted on first-degree murder charges and held on $1 million bond.

On December 15, 2017, Wright's ex-wife Sherra Wright-Robinson was arrested in Riverside, California in connection with the murder. Wright-Robinson was a former member of Turner's church. The seven-year investigation into his death was one of the Memphis Police Department's more high-profile unsolved cases. Wright's mother, Deborah Marion, told The Commercial Appeal that a police official told her Wright-Robinson would be charged with first-degree murder, the same charge Turner faced. Marion said she believes her former daughter-in-law was motivated by money, specifically a life insurance policy for $1 million held by Lorenzen Wright.

In a 2015 article in The Commercial Appeal, Wright-Robinson explained how she inquired early in the investigation whether she was a suspect. "They was like, no, you know," she said. "It was just kind of a person of interest. They said that the list was long and wide and they didn't have any real suspects, if you want to quote that."

Records showed that on August 1, 2010, Memphis police searched her home and found burned pieces of metal and a letter addressed to Lorenzen Wright and her, but law enforcement at that time did not say what the items meant to investigators.

In 2014, Wright-Robinson agreed to a confidential settlement of a dispute in circuit court over how she spent the $1 million of insurance money meant to benefit their six children.

On July 25, 2019, Wright-Robinson pled guilty to facilitation of first-degree murder in the shooting death of Lorenzen Wright and was sentenced to 30 years in prison.

See also
List of solved missing person cases

NBA career statistics

Regular season

|-
| style="text-align:left;"| 
| style="text-align:left;"| L.A. Clippers
| 77 || 51 || 25.1 || .481 || .250 || .587 || 6.1 || .6 || .6 || .8 || 7.3
|-
| style="text-align:left;"| 
| style="text-align:left;"| L.A. Clippers
| 69 || 38 || 30.0 || .445 || .000 || .659 || 8.8 || .8 || .8 || 1.3 || 9.0
|-
| style="text-align:left;"| 
| style="text-align:left;"| L.A. Clippers
| 48 || 15 || 23.6 || .458 || .000 || .692 || 7.5 || .7 || .5 || .8 || 6.6
|-
| style="text-align:left;"| 
| style="text-align:left;"| Atlanta
| 75 || 0 || 16.1 || .499 || .333 || .644 || 4.1 || .3 || .4 || .5 || 6.0
|-
| style="text-align:left;"| 
| style="text-align:left;"| Atlanta
| 71 || 46 || 28.0 || .448 || .000 || .718 || 7.5 || 1.2 || .6 || .9 || 12.4
|-
| style="text-align:left;"| 
| style="text-align:left;"| Memphis
| 43 || 33 || 29.1 || .459 || .000 || .569 || 9.4 || 1.0 || .7 || .5 || 12.0
|-
| style="text-align:left;"| 
| style="text-align:left;"| Memphis
| 70 || 49 || 28.3 || .454 || .000 || .659 || 7.5 || 1.1 || .7 || .8 || 11.4
|-
| style="text-align:left;"| 
| style="text-align:left;"| Memphis
| 65 || 46 || 25.8 || .439 || .000 || .733 || 6.8 || 1.1 || .7 || .9 || 9.4
|-
| style="text-align:left;"| 
| style="text-align:left;"| Memphis
| 80 || 77 || 28.6 || .469 || .000 || .662 || 7.7 || 1.1 || .7 || .9 || 9.6
|-
| style="text-align:left;"| 
| style="text-align:left;"| Memphis
| 78 || 58 || 21.7 || .478 || .000 || .564 || 5.1 || .6 || .7 || .6 || 5.8
|-
| style="text-align:left;"| 
| style="text-align:left;"| Atlanta
| 67 || 31 || 15.4 || .448 || .000 || .281 || 3.2 || .6 || .4 || .4 || 2.6
|-
| style="text-align:left;"| 
| style="text-align:left;"| Atlanta
| 13 || 1 || 11.4 || .294 || .000 || .500 || 2.8 || .2 || .2 || .2 || 1.0
|-
| style="text-align:left;"| 
| style="text-align:left;"| Sacramento
| 5 || 0 || 2.6 || .250 || .000 || .000 || .2 || .2 || .0 || .0 || .4
|-
| style="text-align:left;"| 
| style="text-align:left;"| Cleveland
| 17 || 2 || 7.4 || .370 || .000 || .375 || 1.5 || .2 || .2 || .3 || 1.4
|- class="sortbottom"
| style="text-align:center;" colspan="2"| Career
| 778 || 447 || 23.8 || .459 || .069 || .645 || 6.4 || .8 || .6 || .7 || 8.0

Playoffs

|-
| style="text-align:left;"| 1997
| style="text-align:left;"| L.A. Clippers
| 3 || 3 || 30.7 || .406 || .000 || 1.000 || 7.3 || .7 || 1.0 || .7 || 10.3
|-
| style="text-align:left;"| 2004
| style="text-align:left;"| Memphis
| 4 || 4 || 25.0 || .435 || .000 || .333 || 4.3 || .5 || 1.0 || .5 || 5.5
|-
| style="text-align:left;"| 2005
| style="text-align:left;"| Memphis
| 4 || 4 || 21.3 || .571 || .000 || .500 || 5.0 || 2.3 || .3 || .3 || 8.3
|-
| style="text-align:left;"| 2006
| style="text-align:left;"| Memphis
| 4 || 0 || 21.5 || .611 || .000 || .700 || 5.0 || .8 || .0 || 1.0 || 7.3
|- class="sortbottom"
| style="text-align:center;" colspan="2"| Career
| 15 || 11 || 24.2 || .495 || .000 || .652 || 5.3 || 1.1 || .5 || .6 || 7.7

References

External links
 
 NBA.com profile
 Unsolved Murder of Lorenzen Wright

1975 births
2010 deaths
2010s missing person cases
African-American basketball players
All-American college men's basketball players
American men's basketball players
Atlanta Hawks players
Basketball players from Memphis, Tennessee
Centers (basketball)
Cleveland Cavaliers players
Deaths by firearm in Tennessee
Formerly missing people
Los Angeles Clippers draft picks
Los Angeles Clippers players
Male murder victims
McDonald's High School All-Americans
Medalists at the 1995 Summer Universiade
Memphis Grizzlies players
Memphis Tigers men's basketball players
Missing person cases in Tennessee
Murdered African-American people
Parade High School All-Americans (boys' basketball)
People murdered in Tennessee
Power forwards (basketball)
Sacramento Kings players
Sportspeople from Oxford, Mississippi
Universiade gold medalists for the United States
Universiade medalists in basketball
20th-century African-American sportspeople
21st-century African-American sportspeople